Dunstervillea is a genus of flowering plants from the orchid family, Orchidaceae. At present (June 2014), only one species is known, Dunstervillea mirabilis, native to Venezuela (Bolívar Province) to Brazil (State of Roraima), and eastern Ecuador. It is named after the orchidologist G. C. K. Dunsterville.

See also 
 List of Orchidaceae genera

References 

 Pridgeon, A.M., Cribb, P.J., Chase, M.A. & Rasmussen, F. eds. (1999). Genera Orchidacearum 1. Oxford Univ. Press.
 Pridgeon, A.M., Cribb, P.J., Chase, M.A. & Rasmussen, F. eds. (2001). Genera Orchidacearum 2. Oxford Univ. Press.
 Pridgeon, A.M., Cribb, P.J., Chase, M.A. & Rasmussen, F. eds. (2003). Genera Orchidacearum 3. Oxford Univ. Press
 Berg Pana, H. 2005. Handbuch der Orchideen-Namen. Dictionary of Orchid Names. Dizionario dei nomi delle orchidee. Ulmer, Stuttgart

External links 

Orchids of South America
Monotypic Epidendroideae genera
Oncidiinae genera
Oncidiinae